William James Howell (born May 8, 1943) is an American politician from the Commonwealth of Virginia. He represented Virginia's 28th House of Delegates district  from 1992 until 2018 and served as Speaker of the Virginia House of Delegates from 2003 to 2018. He also serves as chairman of the Virginia Sesquicentennial of the American Civil War Commission. Presiding over the House during a period of Republican dominance in that chamber, Howell has been applauded by many in and out of his party as a pragmatic leader but is also notable for heading Virginia's controversial redistricting efforts following the 2010 census and firmly opposing efforts to expand Medicaid under the Patient Protection and Affordable Care Act.

Early life and education
William James Howell was born on May 8, 1943 in Washington, D.C., the second of four children of William Fayette Howell and the former Eileen Hill. His father, an employee of the United Nations Relief and Rehabilitation Administration, joined the World Bank in 1946, where he served in a number of executive positions until his death in 1964. His mother, a native of England and daughter of trade unionist and academic Levi Hill, accompanied her father on a lecture tour of the United States, where she met her future husband.

About a year after Howell's birth, the family moved to Alexandria, Virginia, where he grew up. After graduating from Fairfax High School in 1960, he studied business administration at the University of Richmond, where his classmates included Robert S. Jepson, Jr. and Leslie M. Baker, Jr. He attended the University of Virginia School of Law and was admitted to the state bar in 1967.

Howell was raised in a civically active family and described both of his parents as "New Deal Democrats." Citing a need to discover his own political philosophy while at college, he spent a summer reading different authors from across the ideological spectrum and was eventually influenced by the conservative ideas of Barry Goldwater and Ronald Reagan.

Career

Legal career and community involvement

House of Delegates service and speakership

In 1987, three-term incumbent Republican delegate Thomas M. Moncure Jr. announced that he would not be seeking reelection. Howell ran for the open seat at the urging of state senator John Chichester and easily won the three-way race against Democrat Thomas Savage and Independent Al Fagan.

In 2017, Howell announced that he would not seek reelection, retiring at the end of his term. Later that week, Kirk Cox, who had served under Howell as the House Majority Leader since 2010, was unanimously elected by the General Assembly House Republican Caucus as their choice for the next speaker.

Personal life

Howell married Cecelia Joy "Cessie" Stump in 1966. They live in Falmouth in Stafford County, Virginia. The couple had two sons, William Fayette Howell, II and Leland Jack Howell. The couple has seven grandchildren as well. Howell is a deeply religious Baptist, and, in the 1990s, along with Bob McDonnell, Randy Forbes, and one other delegate, he founded a prayer group and Bible study that meets weekly when the Virginia General Assembly is in session.

Electoral history

References

External links
 

1943 births
Living people
People from Washington, D.C.
People from Falmouth, Virginia
University of Richmond alumni
University of Virginia School of Law alumni
Speakers of the Virginia House of Delegates
Republican Party members of the Virginia House of Delegates
21st-century American politicians
People from Alexandria, Virginia
McGuireWoods people